The Former Residence of Ba Jin (Chinese: 巴金故居), located at 113 Wukang Road in the Xuhui District of Shanghai, China, was the residence of the Chinese writer Ba Jin (1904–2005). Located in the west part of the Shanghai French Concession area, it was originally built in 1923 in a Spanish style. Ba Jin lived there from 1955.

The residence opened to the public as a writer's home museum in December 2011. The house contains a collection of books, manuscripts, and photographs.

Ba Jin's wife, Xiao, died of cancer in 1972 during the time of the Cultural Revolution, having been denied medical treatment. He kept her urn by his bed in the house. In his later years, his granddaughter, Duan Duan, lived with him, sleeping in the same bedroom. He found reading newspapers increasingly difficult, so he listened to the news on the radio in the morning and on television in the lounge each evening.

See also
 Song Ching Ling Memorial Residence in Shanghai

References

External links
 

Museums established in 2011
2011 establishments in China
Buildings and structures completed in 1923
Museums in Shanghai
Houses in Shanghai
Biographical museums in China
Literary museums in China
Historic house museums in China